Toreforant (JNJ-38518168) is an orally-dosed selective antagonist of the histamine H4 receptor that has been studied for various health conditions. It is the successor of a number of H4-selective compounds developed by Johnson & Johnson. Phase IIa clinical trials completed as recently as November 2018 continue to suggest that toreforant is safe.

As of the end of 2020, there is no regulator-approved H4 antagonist. In U.S. Phase II clinical trials, toreforant, by itself, did not show efficacy against eosinophilic asthma. The drug did show at least partial efficacy against rheumatoid arthritis in patients who were nonresponsive to methotrexate. As the H4 receptor is widely implicated in the regulation of inflammatory states, the potential uses for an H4 antagonist remain significant.

See also 
 JNJ-7777120

References 

Benzimidazoles
Piperazines
Anti-inflammatory agents
Johnson & Johnson brands
H4 receptor antagonists
Carboxamides
Chloroarenes